Amal Murkus (born 11 July 1968) is a Palestinian singer. Her post-modern music style has a variety of Mediterranean influences. Her first album, Amal, was released in 1998, and her second, Shauq, in 2004. Her songs take inspiration by Palestinian folklore, traditional Arabic heritage, and pop music elements, and express the struggle against the marginalization and exclusion that Arab Palestinian culture feels.

Early life
Murkus was born and raised in the Arab town of Kafr Yasif in the Galilee area to a Palestinian Christian family, and has devoted her career to promoting Palestinian music and culture. She was the fifth born out of six daughters. Murkus has been performing since she was five years old. In 1979, she won first prize in the Arab children's song festival, and went on to graduate from the Institute for Stage Art "Beit Tsvi" in 1990.

Music career
Murkus is a member of the counseling board of Free Muse, an organization working against the censorship of art and music. She took an active part in its congress in Denmark in 2003. Amal is currently studying art as a tool for social change at Musrara College in Jerusalem.

Murkus appears regularly on TV in various educational and cultural programs. She has also appeared in feature films and was nominated for the Israeli Oscar for her performance in Ali Nasar's movie The Milky Way. In 2003, Murkus won 'Best Actress' at the Haifa Theatre Festival. Her extensive vocal range and abilities enable Murkus to sing in a wide variety of genres, from traditional Arab to modern popular western styles. As a result, she has created some remarkable collaborations with other artists and international musicians, including Joan Baez in an anti-war concert that took place in Tel Aviv in 1988; Mercedes Sosa; Oliver Shante, Germany; Stadio, Italy; the Greek singer Glykeria; Noa; Anwar Ebrahem from Tunisia, Enzo Avitabile of Italy; Nana Caymmi in Brazil; Robert Wyatt in the UK and The Royal Liverpool Philharmonic Orchestra (UK) in 2005, and many others.

Murkus has also completed projects with the Palestinian poets Mahmoud Darwish in Nazareth in 2000 and Kafr Yasif in 1999, and Samih al-Qasim in 2006. Murkus has received many commendations for her unique art and music and for her work with local communities.

In 2001, Murkus was chosen by Austrian TV as one of the most beautiful voices of the 20th century, after taking part in a music film produced by the Arte TV "Premadonas Fest", by the director-musician Andrew Heller, with Jesse Norman and Harris Alexiou, D.D. Bridgewater and others. Her first album, self-entitled "Amal" was written and composed by a diverse group of artists and musicians. It was released internationally in 2000 by EMI Hemisphere.

Her second album Shauq ("Longing") was recorded live in April 2004, at the Crown Hall in Jerusalem, with the Jerusalem Symphony Orchestra. Her third album is  Na'na' ya Na'na''' ("Peppermint, O Peppermint").

Amal has appeared in international music festivals and toured widely. She attracted attention when she was featured alongside the Palestinian rap group DAM in their critically acclaimed single and video clip "If I Could Go Back in Time" from the group's album "Dabkeh on the Moon".

Political activism
Amal considers herself a communist and a feminist. The Islamic Movement in Israel demanded that her performances be cancelled during the Ramadan. She says "I refused to cancel. I knew that this was not the real reason, since singing during Ramadan is not forbidden. I suppose that the people from the Islamic Movement are bothered by my social agenda. I criticize not only the Zionists, but also what is happening in my own society. I call for the liberation and empowerment of women. I believe that women hold the key – if they do not progress, society will not progress. But the Islamic Movement wants us to remain in the dark".

In August 2008 Amal sang at the birthday of Maria Amman, a Palestinian girl from the Gaza Strip who lost her mother, two of her brothers, her aunt and her grandmother after her house was hit by an IDF projectile, which also left Maria severely injured and almost completely paralyzed. Murkus said that she was trying to "give Maria a mother's attention, not just my songs, in a humble attempt to fill a tiny bit of the void left in her life. I came today to utter Maria's voice. The voice of Palestinian children, who are victimized by the war. The State should allow Maria and her family to stay, for her to receive the best treatment possible; that would be the least the State can do to make up for what has happened to this child".

Personal life
Murkus is married to Nizar Zreik, an architect, poet and musician, with whom she has two children; Yara Zreik - an actress, vocalist and pianist; and Firas Zreik - a Kanun player, composer and arranger.

DiscographyFattah Al Ward, (2015)Baghani (I Sing), 2011 Na'na' ya Na' na' (Peppermint, O Peppermint), 2007 Shauq (Longing), 2004Amal (Hope) self-titled. 1998RemixesCalvinQo Presents Amal Murkus-Ya Oud (Original Mix), 2009Israeli Made a Remix for the song Ya OudCompilationsListen to the Banned'', 2010

Singles 

 Nas (2020)
 Dola (2020)

References

1968 births
Living people
Arab citizens of Israel
21st-century Israeli women singers
Articles containing video clips
Israeli Arab Christians
Israeli women activists
Israeli Arab feminists
Israeli communists
Palestinian communists
People from Northern District (Israel)
Palestinian women singers